Elżbieta Wierniuk (16 March 1951 – 16 September 2017) was a Polish diver. She competed at the 1968 Summer Olympics and the 1972 Summer Olympics.

References

1951 births
2017 deaths
Polish female divers
Olympic divers of Poland
Divers at the 1968 Summer Olympics
Divers at the 1972 Summer Olympics
People from Jawor
Medalists at the 1970 Summer Universiade
20th-century Polish women